Vuelta, Spanish for "lap" or "roundtrip", is used in the name of a number of cycling races in Spanish speaking countries, as well as a few other contexts:

Cycling races
 Vuelta a Andalucía
 Vuelta a Aragón, Spain
 Vuelta a Asturias, Spain
 Vuelta a Bolivia
 Vuelta a Burgos, Spain
 Vuelta a Cantabria, Spain
 Vuelta a Castilla y León, Spain
 Vuelta a Chihuahua, Mexico
 Vuelta a Colombia
 Vuelta a Colombia Femenina Oro y Paz
 Vuelta a Cuba
 Vuelta a El Salvador
 Vuelta a España
 Vuelta a Extremadura, Spain
 Vuelta a Guatemala
 Vuelta a la Argentina
 Vuelta a La Rioja, Spain
 Vuelta a Mallorca
 Vuelta a Murcia, Spain
 Vuelta a Navarra, Spain
 Vuelta a Paraguay
 Vuelta a Perú
 Vuelta a San Juan, Argentina
 Vuelta a Tenerife, Canary Islands, Spain
 Vuelta a Venezuela
 Vuelta a la Comunitat Valenciana Feminas, Spain
 Vuelta a la Independencia Nacional, Dominican Republic
 Vuelta al Ecuador
 Vuelta al Táchira, Venezuela
 Vuelta Ciclista a Costa Rica
 Vuelta Ciclista a León, Spain
 Vuelta Ciclista Chiapas, Mexico
 Vuelta Ciclista de Chile
 Vuelta del Uruguay
 Vuelta Femenina a Guatemala
 Vuelta Internacional Femenina a Costa Rica
 Vuelta Mexico Telmex
 Vuelta por un Chile Líder, Chile

Other uses
 Vuelta (magazine), literary magazine published in Mexico from 1976 to 1998
 Vuelta (album) (2004), by Richard Shindell
 Vuelta Abajo, a region of Cuba

See also
 Battle of Vuelta de Obligado (1845)
 "Da la Vuelta", 1999 song released by Marc Anthony
 De Vuelta a Casa (1996), album by Eddie Santiago
 De vuelta al barrio (2017–), Peruvian television series
 De Vuelta en la Trampa (1992), album by Lalo Rodríguez
 De Vuelta y Vuelta (2001), album by Jarabe de Palo
 La Vuelta al nido (1938), Argentine film
 La Vuelta de Martín Fierro (1974), Argentine film
 La vuelta de Rocha (1937), Argentine film
 Olvídame y Pega la Vuelta (1982), song by Pimpinela 
 Vueltas (disambiguation)